Brachychiton australis, commonly known as the broad-leaved bottle tree, is a small tree of the genus Brachychiton found in eastern Australia. It was originally classified in the family Sterculiaceae, which is now within Malvaceae.

Notes

References

australis
Flora of Queensland
Malvales of Australia
Trees of Australia
Ornamental trees
Drought-tolerant trees
Plants described in 1897